Westerhout is a Dutch surname.

Westerhout may also refer to:

People with the surname
 Alexander Westerhout (1590–1661), a Dutch glass painter
 Gart Westerhout (1927–2012), a Dutch astronomer 
 Madeleine Westerhout (born 1990), an American political secretary

Other
 A 20th-century astronomical catalog, including W40, W43, and W49
 The asteroid 5105 Westerhout (also known as )